Dean Arsene (born July 20, 1980) is a Canadian retired professional ice hockey defenceman. While he played the majority of his AHL career with the Hershey Bears, he last played with the Abbotsford Heat of the American Hockey League (AHL). He played 13 games in the National Hockey League (NHL) with the Edmonton Oilers.

Playing career
To date, Arsene's professional career has been almost solely in the American Hockey League, where he has played twelve seasons. He spent six of those seasons (from 2003–04 to 2008–09) with the Hershey Bears, winning the league's championship Calder Cup twice in that tenure, and earning the fond nickname "Mayor of Chocolatetown."

Following his second Calder Cup, Arsene chose to sign the two-way contract with the Edmonton Oilers in the hope of earning some playing time in the NHL on July 16, 2009. That hope was realized when he was called up for a two-game stint in late 2009. He spent the majority of the 2009–10 season as the captain of the Springfield Falcons, however he was again later recalled on an emergency basis on March 22, 2010, finishing out the season with Edmonton.

On August 11, 2010, Arsene signed as a free agent to a one-year, two-way contract with the St. Louis Blues.

Arsene signed a one-year contract with the Phoenix Coyotes on July 6, 2011. He spent the entirety of the 2011–12 season, with AHL affiliate, the Portland Pirates.

On August 9, 2012, Arsene agreed to a one-year American League contract with the St. John's IceCaps.

In his final professional season, Arsene returned home, signing a one-year contract with the Abbotsford Heat for the 2013–14 campaign. Arsene posted 7 points in 42 games before announcing his retirement upon the Heat's first round exit in the playoffs on May 7, 2014.

Career statistics

References

External links

1980 births
Living people
Abbotsford Heat players
Canadian expatriate ice hockey players in the United States
Canadian ice hockey defencemen
Charlotte Checkers (1993–2010) players
Edmonton Ice players
Edmonton Oilers players
Hartford Wolf Pack players
Hershey Bears players
Ice hockey people from British Columbia
Kootenay Ice players
Peoria Rivermen (AHL) players
Portland Pirates players
Reading Royals players
Regina Pats players
St. John's IceCaps players
Springfield Falcons players
Undrafted National Hockey League players